The Bayer designation Psi Lupi (ψ Lup / ψ Lupi) is shared by two stars, in the constellation Lupus:

ψ¹ Lupi
ψ² Lupi

Lupi, Psi
Lupus (constellation)